Sandbakken is an urban settlement in Sarpsborg municipality, Norway.  Sandbakken located on Klavestadhaugen, a few kilometers southeast of the Sarpsborg city centre. Before municipal amalgamation in 1992, Sandbakken belonged to Skjeberg municipality.

References

Villages in Østfold
Sarpsborg